The following is a list of Zygaenidae of Nepal. Thirty-seven different species are listed.

This list is primarily based on Colin Smith's 2010 "Lepidoptera of Nepal", which is based on Toshiro Haruta's "Moths of Nepal (Vol. 1-6)" with some recent additions and a modernized classification. 

Achelura bifasciata
Agalope glacialis - glacial-winged moth
Agalope butleri
Agalope harutei
Agalope hyalina
Agalope primularis
Agalope suzukikojii
Alophogaster rubribasis
Amesia aliris
Arachotia flaviplaga
Artona walkeri syn. Artona confusa
Callamesia midama
Callamesia midama f. hormenoa
Campylotes histrionicus
Campylotes sikkimensis
Chalcophaedra zuleika
Chacosia auxo albata
Clelea discriminis
Corma maculata
Cyclosia papilionaris

Erasmia pulchella pulchella
Eterusia aedea edocla f. dulcis - red-slug moth
Eterusia aedea edocla f. edocla

Eterusia tricolor
Eumorphopsis leis
Gynautocera papilionaria
Histia flabellicornis flabellicornis
Lophosoma cuprea
Milleria adalifa
Phacusa tenebrosa
Phauda flammans
Philopata basimacula
Pidorus glaucopis
Pidorus leno
Soritia bicolor
Soritia circinata
Soritia pulchella
Soritia risa
Praezygaena caschmirensis

See also
List of butterflies of Nepal
Odonata of Nepal
Cerambycidae of Nepal
Wildlife of Nepal

References

 01
Zygaenidae
Insects of Nepal